Grzegorz Panfil (born 1 January 1988) is a Polish professional tennis player.

Career highlights
Panfils' highlights include his win at the F1 Ukrainian Futures Tournament, and his achievements at the Hopman Cup.

Hopman Cup 
At the 2014 Hopman Cup he represented Poland with Agnieszka Radwańska.  The pairing made it to the final, and on the way Panfil defeated 11th-ranked Milos Raonic 7–6(7–1), 6–3 (at the time Panfil was ranked World No. 288). The talent he displayed through his play at the tournament led for repeated calls by the broadcast commentators (including Darren Cahill) for Panfil to be offered wildcard entry into the Australian Open. The Hopman Cup provided the largest prize-money win of his career, and in the final he played in front of the largest stadium crowd (circa 10000), to date.

Australian Open 
Panfil would eventually enter the qualifying round at the Australian Open as an Alternate. He lost in the first round to Lorenzo Giustino, 3–6, 6–4, 3–6.

ATP Challenger and ITF Futures finals

Singles: 23 (11–12)

Doubles: 57 (32–25)

References:
 ITFTennis.com
 TennisLive.net

Junior Grand Slam finals

Doubles: 1 (1–0)

References

External links
 
 
 Official site

Polish male tennis players
Hopman Cup competitors
1988 births
Living people
Sportspeople from Zabrze
Australian Open (tennis) junior champions
Grand Slam (tennis) champions in boys' doubles